Sumat Prasad (born August 1893, date of death unknown) was an Indian politician. He was a Member of Parliament, representing Uttar Pradesh in the Rajya Sabha the upper house of India's Parliament representing the Indian National Congress.

References

External links
 Official biographical sketch in Parliament of India website

1893 births
Year of death missing
Rajya Sabha members from Uttar Pradesh
Indian National Congress politicians
Lok Sabha members from Uttar Pradesh
India MPs 1957–1962
India MPs 1962–1967
India MPs 1967–1970